Almak may refer to:

Almak, Russia, a rural locality in Kazbekovsky District, Republic of Dagestan, Russia
Almaki, or Almak, a village in Zanjan Province, Iran
Almak (BFM), a French civilian training ship for cadets of foreign navies
MV Almak (1951), a ship built by John Brown & Company
Gamma Andromedae, or Almak, a star in the constellation Andromeda
Almak, a Star Trek character